Oakland Cemetery is one of the largest cemetery green spaces in Atlanta, Georgia, U.S. Founded as Atlanta Cemetery in 1850 on six acres (2.4 hectares) of land southeast of the city, it was renamed in 1872 to reflect the large number of oak and magnolia trees growing in the area. By that time, the city had grown and the cemetery had enlarged correspondingly to the current . Since then, Atlanta has continued to expand so that the cemetery is now located in the center of the city. Oakland is an excellent example of a Victorian-style cemetery, and reflects the "garden cemetery" movement started and exemplified by Mount Auburn Cemetery in Massachusetts.

The original  of Oakland remains one of the oldest historical plots of land in Atlanta, most of the rest of the city having been burned in 1864. Because of its age and location, the cemetery directly reflects the history and changing culture of the City of Atlanta and the significant events it has seen. Names of Atlanta streets, buildings, parks, subdivisions, and more can be found within the cemetery gates. An estimated 70,000 people are interred at Oakland, and while the last plots were sold in 1884, there are still regular burials today. These are largely conducted on family-owned plots or areas owned by Atlanta (one of the most recent being former mayor Maynard Jackson, whose plot was contributed by the city).

Sections

Original  

Immediately upon entering the gates of Oakland is found the original  purchased for use as the Atlanta Cemetery in 1850. The gates and perimeter walls were not erected until 1896, the date engraved on the keystone of the gates' highest arch. After a short distance along a brick walkway, Oakland's first resident since its establishment can be found. Dr. James Nissen was a medical doctor visiting Atlanta who fell ill and died in 1850. Legend has it that Dr. Nissen shared a common fear of the day, being buried alive. Therefore, before his death he asked that his jugular vein be cut prior to his burial to ensure he did not wake up later under the ground. Being the oldest grave in Oakland since its designation as a city cemetery, Nissen's headstone is nearly completely worn away by the passage of time and the elements. The inscription is only known due to an extensive survey of Atlanta cemeteries performed in the 1930s by Franklin Garrett. Back towards the main gates of Oakland on a plot donated by the City of Atlanta lies Martha Lumpkin Compton. The daughter of Governor Wilson Lumpkin, from 1843 until 1845 Atlanta was known as "Marthasville" in her honor.

The first thing many people notice when entering the gates of Oakland is the mausoleum of Jasper Newton Smith, on which sits a striking life-size statue of Smith himself. Smith was a businessman and real estate investor who rose to prominence in post-war Reconstruction Era Atlanta. Smith was well known for refusing to wear a necktie due to a bad experience as a child. Therefore, one story describing the creation of his statue notes that when the artist sculpted him wearing a cravat, Smith refused to pay until the offending item had been chiseled off. Another story notes that Smith once travelled to the cemetery to personally remove a vine that had wrapped around the neck of the statue.

Farther into this section the Kontz Memorial and the Neal Monument, two sculptures showing vastly different styles of artistry, can be seen. The latter is an example of Neoclassical art and imagery, while the former is Oakland's only known example of Egyptian Revival. Also to be found in the original  is a small area of land marking the old Jewish section. This area was bought by the Hebrew Benevolent Congregation (which later bought more land in the expanded cemetery) and is the second oldest Jewish burial ground in the state of Georgia, preceded by a colonial Jewish cemetery in Savannah.

Also resting in the original  is Robert Tyre "Bobby" Jones, an Atlanta-native amateur golfer known for first winning The Double. His grave can always be found with golf balls and other paraphernalia relating to the sport. The immediate area surrounding Jones' grave is adorned by all eighteen flower-bearing plants that are the namesakes of the holes on the Augusta National course. Franklin Garrett, a man dubbed "Atlanta's Official Historian" who extensively cataloged Atlanta's history as well as many of the graves at Oakland and other Atlanta-area cemeteries also rests in the original .

While walking throughout the original , and indeed much of the entire cemetery, many visitors will notice a lack of ironwork which is uncommon to a cemetery from Oakland's era. This is due to the City of Atlanta's contribution of much of the original ironwork in Oakland to the U.S. government for use in producing arms during World War I.

Confederate section 

The Confederate section of Oakland is home to an estimated 6,900 burials, of which about 3,000 are unknown. During the Civil War, Atlanta was a major transportation and medical center for the Southern states. Since several of the largest military hospitals in the area were within a half mile (800 m) from Oakland, many soldiers who died from their wounds were buried here. Shortly after the war ended, a few thousand fallen soldiers from the Atlanta Campaign who were previously buried in battleground graves were moved to the Confederate grounds in Oakland. The area is marked by a large monument known as the Confederate Obelisk. This 65 foot (20 m) tall obelisk is made from granite quarried from Stone Mountain and was dedicated on April 26, 1874, the anniversary of Joseph E. Johnston's surrender to William Sherman. For a number of years, the Confederate Obelisk was the tallest structure in Atlanta. To the northwest, very close to the obelisk itself, are buried four Confederate generals, John B. Gordon, Lucius J. Gartrell,  Clement A. Evans, and Alfred Iverson, Jr. To the south of the obelisk is a large section of marked military graves. Of special note are the 16 marked graves of Union soldiers that are buried alongside Confederate soldiers. This practice was very uncommon at the time, but was likely done at Oakland due to dwindling burial space. Formerly located in the Confederate section was the Lion of the Confederacy, or Lion of Atlanta. The lion sculpture was removed by the City of Atlanta on August 18, 2021 after repeated vandalism. The lion, which guarded a field containing the remains of unknown Confederate dead, was commissioned by the Atlanta Ladies Memorial Association and carved by T. M. Brady in 1894 out of the largest piece of marble quarried from north Georgia up to that time. Though Brady claimed that the design was original, with a few exceptions it is actually a near copy of the Swiss Lion of Lucerne.

New Jewish section 

Located relatively close to the old Jewish section contained in the original , the plots designated as the "new" Jewish section were acquired by the Hebrew Benevolent Congregation in 1878 and 1892. The burial sites, and the headstones and monuments marking them, reflect the blending of the German-Jewish culture of which the Benevolent Congregation was primarily comprised, and the American culture that the community had adopted. In contrast to this cultural blending are the resting places of members of the Ahavath Achim Synagogue, to which the Benevolent Congregation sold some of the plots. Members of the Ahavath Achim Synagogue were mostly Eastern European Jewish immigrants who were much more Orthodox. Unlike the Benevolent Congregation, the Synagogue sought to preserve their traditional culture and to avoid cultural blending. This is evident in the grave sites of members of the Synagogue, which are identifiable by their use of the Hebrew language and engravings of traditional Jewish symbols. In more recent years, the new Jewish section fell victim to vandalism by two teenaged locals in 1982.

Potter's Field 
Potter's Field is a 7.5 acre (3 hectare) area that is traditionally designated for burial of those without the means to purchase a plot of land. Beyond the outer wall bordering the field is the former Fulton Bag and Cotton Mill (since renovated into loft apartments) and Cabbagetown, both constructed by Jacob Elsas, who is buried in the new Jewish section. By 1884 all of the traditional plots at Oakland had been sold. This meant that peoples' only options for burial at Oakland were to either buy a plot from a private owner or be buried in Potter's Field, and records show that many people opted for the latter. Potter's Field makes a significant contribution to the number of residents at Oakland, as indicated by a 1978 archaeological survey conducted by Georgia State University that revealed the entire area to be occupied by an estimated 17,000 persons.

Black section 
This section of the cemetery is a testament to the period of history during which segregation was at its height in the United States. The entire cemetery reflects the great cultural changes that occurred in Atlanta during its service; from the Jim Crow era exhibited by the segregated black section to the modern era that strives for social equality, as shown by the recent burial of Maynard Jackson on a plot in the original  of Oakland. One striking feature that visitors will notice is that the black section, similarly to the adjoining Potter's Field, lacks a great deal of headstones, monuments, and grave markers in general. This is because many grave markers here were made of wood and other biodegradable materials. These markers have succumbed to the passing of time and as a result have rendered a large portion of the grave sites in the black section unknown. Despite the social difficulties that had to be overcome by African-Americans living in the Southern states at the time, there are several outstanding black figures buried at Oakland who made significant contributions to the history of Atlanta. Some of these include Bishop Wesley John Gaines, Reverend Frank Quarles (an early benefactor of Morehouse College), Carrie Steele Logan, and Antoine Graves, the owner of the only mausoleum in the black section.

Bell Tower 

Before the Bell Tower was constructed in 1899, a farmhouse owned by James E. Williams, who would later be mayor of Atlanta, stood in the spot. From this location, General John B. Hood directed Confederate forces in the Battle of Atlanta on July 22, 1864. The Bell Tower building as it stands today was originally the sexton's office and living quarters. Atop the tower is a bell that was formerly used to signal for workers to gather at that location, and for funerals. The basement was used as a vault for storing coffins awaiting burial. In 1998 the Bell Tower building saw extensive restoration and now serves as the offices of the Historic Oakland Foundation as well as the cemetery's visitor center.

Monuments and mausolea 
As with most cemeteries of comparable size and age, Oakland contains numerous monuments and mausolea that are often outstanding examples of art and symbolism, or are of great historical significance. In the southeast area of the cemetery is a historical marker describing the events surrounding the Great Locomotive Chase, in which Union raiders stole the locomotive General with the intent of cutting vital telegraph lines. They were captured by Confederate forces and seven of them were hanged in Oakland and temporarily interred there before being moved to the National Cemetery at Chattanooga. Near the Bell Tower lies a monument dedicated by the City of Atlanta to its first mayor, Moses Formwalt, who was also the youngest Atlanta mayor at 28 years old.

Sitting atop a hill near the original  is the Austell Mausoleum, likely the most elaborate in Oakland. The mausoleum was constructed by Alfred Austell, one of the founders of Atlanta National Bank, in the Gothic Revival style. The Austell Mausoleum cost around $90,000 to build in the 1880s, and is estimated to cost over $3 million to replace by today's standards. Another notable burial on the original  is the rose-adorned site of the Marsh family, on which Margaret Mitchell Marsh, author of Gone with the Wind, rests. Near the Marsh grave is a gas lamp that was one of the original 50 installed by the Atlanta Gas Light company in 1856. The lamp, which bears scars from the shelling of Atlanta in 1864, was donated to the cemetery by Franklin Miller Garrett. The keen observer might notice that the plaque that describes the gas lamp's history incorrectly dates the lamp to 1850.

Historic Oakland Foundation 
Since Oakland is not and was never a perpetual care cemetery, maintenance of grave sites was the responsibility of the families of the interred. Of course, time sees the movement of families and the general disconnection with ancestors as generations pass. Because of this, many grave sites have fallen into disrepair from neglect and sometimes vandalism. Therefore, shortly after Oakland was added to the National Register of Historic Places on April 28, 1976, the Historic Oakland Foundation was established. The Foundation has overseen the restoration and upkeep of many grave sites, monuments, mausolea, and buildings that had been affected by the ravages of time. Their activity, which is supported by donations, grants, and special events, continues today as they maintain and restore the cemetery as well as provide guided tours of the grounds.

Notable burials 

 27 former Atlanta mayors, including:
 Ivan Allen, Jr.
 Moses Formwalt (Atlanta's first mayor)
 Maynard Jackson (Atlanta's first African-American mayor)
 S. B. Spencer
 6 former Georgia governors:
 Joseph E. Brown (1821-04-15 – 1894-11-30)
 Joseph Mackey Brown (1851-12-28 – 1932-03-03)
 John B. Gordon (1832-02-06 – 1904-01-09) 
 William J. Northen (1835-06-09 – 1913-03-25)
 John Marshall Slaton (1866-12-25 – 1955-06-11)
 Hoke Smith (1855-11-02 – 1931-11-27)
 Confederate Generals:
 Lucius J. Gartrell
 Clement A. Evans (1833-02-25 – 1911-07-02)
 John B. Gordon
 Alfred Iverson, Jr.
 William Ambrose Wright (1844 – 1929), Confederate lieutenant
 Martha Wilson Lumpkin Compton (1827-08-25 – 1917-02-13), daughter of Governor Wilson Lumpkin and namesake of Marthasville, Atlanta's name from 1843 until approximately 1845
 William Fuller, Jefferson Cain, and Anthony Murphy, Western & Atlantic Railroad employees involved in the Great Locomotive Chase
 Bishop Wesley John Gaines (1840-10-04 – 1912-01-12), Bishop of the African Methodist Episcopal Church and founder of Morris Brown College.
 Franklin Miller Garrett (1906-09-25 – 2000-03-05), Atlanta historian notable for his extensive survey of Atlanta cemeteries. He was dubbed "Atlanta's Official Historian" and is buried on commons ground on a plot donated by the City of Atlanta.
 Joel Hurt, founder of Inman Park and Druid Hills, two of Atlanta's first planned subdivisions
 Dr. Joseph Jacobs, owner of the pharmacy where John Pemberton first sold Coca-Cola as a soft drink
 Bobby Jones (1902-03-17 – 1971-12-18), the only golfer to win the Grand Slam, the U.S. Amateur, U.S. Open, British Amateur and The Open Championship in the same year
 Carrie Steele Logan (c. 1829 – 1900-11-03), founder of the first black orphanage in Georgia, now known as the Carrie Steele-Pitts Home. Kept orphans in a boxcar in the rail yard where she worked and brought them home with her at night.
 Eugene Mitchell, lawyer and president of the Atlanta Board of Education
 Margaret Mitchell Marsh, author of Gone with the Wind
 Maybelle Stephens Mitchell, suffragist and activist
 Reverend Frank Quarles, key figure in establishing Atlanta Baptist Female Seminary, which later became Spelman College
 Morris and Emanuel Rich, founders of Rich's department store.
 Edward A. Vincent, architect of Atlanta's first passenger depot and publisher of the first official map of the city (unmarked grave).
 Benjamin Franklin White, shape note "singing master", and compiler of the shape note tunebook known as The Sacred Harp.
 Alexander Stephens, Vice President of the Confederate States of America, was interred for a time at Oakland before being moved to his estate near Crawfordville.
 Annie Fitzgerald Stephens, landowner and businesswoman, grandmother of Margaret Mitchell
 Orelia Key Bell, poet, buried alongside her long-time friend, Ida Jane Ash.
Andrew Steiner, Holocaust survivor saved as many as 7,000 Slovakian Jews by convincing Nazi officials to create workshops staffed by Jews, renowned architect who developed master plan for Jekyll Island, Stone Mountain, and Callaway Gardens.
 Martha Loftin Wilson (1834–1919), missionary worker, journal editor, heroine of the American Civil War
 Kenny Rogers (1938–2020), singer, songwriter, musician, actor, record producer, and entrepreneur

Fictional portrayals
In Margaret Mitchell's 1936 novel, Gone With The Wind, Oakland Cemetery is mentioned as the final resting place of Scarlett O'Hara's first husband, Charles Hamilton, and as the burial place of many Confederate soldiers who died during the Civil War.

2008 tornado
On March 14, 2008, Oakland Cemetery sustained significant damage when a tornado tore through downtown Atlanta.  The City Sexton, Sam Reed, estimated that 50 to 60 trees were toppled and many more significantly damaged.  Dozens of headstones and obelisks were also destroyed.  Additionally, debris from other damaged buildings was blown into the cemetery; a shredded window blind was "draped like a necklace" around one marker.  It was the first tornado to hit the downtown area since weather record keeping began in the 1880s.<ref
name="ajctornado">Friday tornado pummels downtown; Saturday storm kills 2 by Tim Eberly and Paul Shea for the Atlanta Journal and Constitution, March 15, 2008.  Retrieved March 15, 2008.</ref><ref
name="ajclandmarks">Atlanta Tornado: The Aftermath: Landmarks Take a Hit by Rhonda Cook et al. for the Atlanta Journal and Constitution, March 16, 2008.  Retrieved March 16, 2008.</ref>

A map of the storm shows that the largest intensity of the storm was centered over the cemetery.

See article: 2008 Atlanta tornado outbreak.

See also 
 List of United States cemeteries
 List of oldest structures in Atlanta

Notes

References

External links 

 Official website of the Historic Oakland Foundation
 Topographical Map of Oakland and Surrounding Area
 Oakland Cemetery: Walking & Running Trails in Atlanta’s Historic Garden Cemetery
 Oakland Cemetery Burials – Photographs and transcriptions of all Confederate grave markers in Oakland Cemetery.
 Hebrew Benevolent Congregation
 Atlanta, Georgia, a National Park Service Discover Our Shared Heritage Travel Itinerary
 Ahavath Achim Synagogue
 Steve Bransford, Oakland Cemetery, Southern Spaces 13 July 2009.
 Joyce Youmans, Oakland Cemetery in Grant Park, BURNAWAY 25 February 2009.
 Southern Museum of Civil War & Locomotive History, http://www.southernmuseum.org/, home of the locomotive General
 The Atlanta Cyclorama, home of the locomotive Texas
 Oakland Cemetery historical marker

Landmarks in Atlanta
Cemeteries in Georgia (U.S. state)
Cemeteries on the National Register of Historic Places in Georgia (U.S. state)
Cemeteries in Atlanta
National Register of Historic Places in Atlanta
 
1850 establishments in Georgia (U.S. state)